Petobo was a village near Palu in Indonesia, which was destroyed in 2018 by an earthquake.

History 
In 2018, the village was destroyed by a landslide triggered by the Sulawesi earthquake and tsunami.

Gallery

References 

Former villages
Populated places in Central Sulawesi